Galesburg is an unincorporated community in Putnam County, in the U.S. state of Missouri.

Galesburg was platted in 1858.

References

Unincorporated communities in Putnam County, Missouri
Unincorporated communities in Missouri